

This is a list of the National Register of Historic Places listings in Blair County, Pennsylvania.

This is intended to be a complete list of the properties and districts on the National Register of Historic Places in Blair County, Pennsylvania, United States.  The locations of National Register properties and districts for which the latitude and longitude coordinates are included below, may be seen in a map.

There are 28 properties and districts listed on the National Register in the county. Two sites are further designated as National Historic Landmarks and another is designated a National Historic Site.

Current listings

|}

Former listings

|}

See also 

 List of Pennsylvania state historical markers in Blair County

References 

Blair County